Niagadina  is a village and rural commune in the Cercle of Kati in the Koulikoro Region of south-western Mali. The commune has an area of 87 square kilometers and includes five villages. The administrative center is the village of Niagadina which lies on the right bank of the Niger River, 72 km southwest of Bamako, the Malian capital. In the 2009 census the commune had a population of 11,961.

References

External links
.

Communes of Koulikoro Region
Communities on the Niger River